Levsha (Russian: «Левша» ("Lefty" or the "Left-Hander")) may refer to:

"The Tale of Cross-eyed Lefty from Tula and the Steel Flea", comic story by Nikolai Leskov 1881
Left-Hander (1964 film), Russian film based on the story by Nikolai Leskov 
The Left-Hander (1986 film), Russian film based on the story, 1986
The Left-Hander (opera), a 2013 opera by Shchedrin, based on the story by Nikolai Leskov